Cantabrian language may refer to:

The modern Cantabrian dialect
The ancient Celtic language of the Cantabrian people